A foreign sales agent is a person or entity acting as a foreign representative for a domestic company.

References

International trade